Minna Keene, née Töneböne, (5 February 1859 – November 1943) was a German-born, self-taught Canadian pictorial portrait photographer, considered "hugely successful".

Keene was born in Rumbeck, Waldeck, now part of the city of Hessisch Oldendorf, Germany, in 1859. She lived in the United Kingdom, South Africa, and Canada. She married Caleb Keene in 1887. She died in Oakville, Ontario, Canada, in 1943.

Keene was an early female member of the Linked Ring, a photographic society created to show that photography was just as much an art as it was a science, and to propel photography further into the fine art world. She was also a member of the London Salon of Photography and the first woman to be admitted as a fellow to the Royal Photographic Society.

Biography
Minna Bergmann was born Doris Wilhelmine Charlotte Töneböne in Rumbeck, Waldeck (now part of the city of Hessisch-Oldendorf), on 5 February 1859, the illegitimate daughter of Dorothea Charlotte Töneböne (1832-1874). Her mother married Louis Bergmann (1822-1879), a police constable and former musician, in Arolsen, Waldeck, in 1862; she was confirmed as Minna Bergmann in Arolsen on Easter Sunday, 1872. Minna married Caleb Keene (b. 1862) in Chelsea, London, in 1887. Caleb was a "decorator's apprentice" and brother of the landscape painter cum "photographic artist" Elmer Ezra Keene (1853–1929). Minna’s first mention in the photographic literature occurs in the late 1890s, when she is found submitting work (with some success) to competitions in the art journal The Studio and to a selection of regional photographic societies, including the Chelmsford Camera Club and Southsea Exhibition. After immigrating to Canada in about 1913, Keene was commissioned by the CPR to photograph the Rockies (1914–15). In 1920, she opened a studio in Toronto, relocating to Oakville in 1922.

Despite innovating in and enriching photography, female photographers were not taken as seriously as their male counterparts. Keene won numerous prizes and established studios in South Africa and Canada; yet when she was featured in an article in Maclean's magazine in 1926, she was described as "a charming hostess" and a "home lover". Her daughter Violet Keene was also a photographer.

Awards
1908: Fellow, Royal Photographic Society of Great Britain

Publications with photographs by Keene
Rediscovery: Canadian Women Photographers 1841–1941. North London, Canada: London Regional Art Gallery, 1983. By Laura Jones. . With work by 13 women: Rossetta E. Carr, Clara Dennis, M. J. Dukelow, Millie Gamble, Mattie Gunterman, Elsie Hollway, Minna Keene, Hannah Maynard, Annie G. McDougall, Geraldine Moodie, Gladys Reeves, Madge Smith, Edith S. Watson; exhibition catalogue; paperback, 36 pages. Includes 14 photographs and brief biographies of 12 of the photographers.
Royal Photographic Society. Women by Women. Rohnert Park, CA: Pomegranate, 1996. With work by 12 women: Anne Brigman, Pamela Booth, Eleanor Parke Custis, Gertrude Käsebier, Madame D'Ora, Adelaide Hanscom, Minna Keene, Rosalinda Maingot, Gisela Markham-Szanto, Eveleen Myers, Hilda Stevenson, Dorothy Wilding; calendar format; 24 pages.

Exhibitions
1910: Fifty-fifth Annual Exhibition of the Royal Photographic Society of Great Britain
1911: Fifty-sixth Annual Exhibition of the Royal Photographic Society of Great Britain
1913: Fifty-eighth Annual Exhibition of the Royal Photographic Society of Great Britain
1983: Rediscovery: Canadian Women Photographers 1841-1941, London, Ontario, Canada
2016: Painting with Light: Art and Photography from the Pre-Raphaelites to the Modern Age, Tate Britain, London.

Collections
Science and Society Picture Library, Science Museum Group, London
The National Archives, Kew, London

References

External links
Malcolm Corrigall, "Minna Keene: A Neglected Pioneer" Image and Text 30 (2018), available open access online
Keene's profile at the Canadian Women Artists History Initiative

1859 births
1943 deaths
People from Bad Arolsen
People from the Principality of Waldeck and Pyrmont
German expatriates in Canada
Canadian women photographers
19th-century Canadian photographers
19th-century women photographers
Portrait photographers